The haik is a traditional women's garment worn in the Maghreb region. It can be white or black, though is usually white. It consists of a rectangular fabric covering the whole body,  in length, rolled up then held at the waist by a belt and then brought back to the shoulders to be fixed by fibulae.

Etymology 
The word is borrowed from the Maghrebi Arabic word , which comes from the Arabic verb  which means "to weave". First used in French in the form  (1654), it underwent many variations  (1667),  (1670),  (1670),  (1683),  (1686). The word  in French was at first of the feminine gender (1725) and became masculine in 1830.

Origins 
The haik is of Arab-Andalusian origin, and present throughout the Maghreb. In 1792, the m'laya, a black veil, popular in the eastern part of Algeria, made its appearance to mourn Salah Bey, Bey of Constantine. Made from wool, silk or synthetic silk fabric, the haik succeeded, in a very short time, to spread throughout all regions of the country, but its use was adapted to the socio-cultural specificities of the region. The  appeared at the end of the nineteenth century and was worn by urban women of Algiers and its suburbs. This type of veil is often associated with feminine beauty and has inspired many Chaabi poets and singers, who dedicated many of their works to them.

A variation on the haik called the huik was worn from the 14th until the late 19th century in the Netherlands and Belgium, usually black and made of wool or silk. It was worn by women as a protection against bad weather. Later variants were worn during a period of mourning.

Present-day use
In Algeria, the haik tends to be abandoned. However, old women wear it, although rarely. 
In Morocco, the use of haik has all but disappeared, except in the cities of Chefchaouen, Essaouira and Figuig, and rare appearances by old women in Oujda. The color of the haik is black or blue in the cities of Taroudant and Tiznit.
In Tunisia, the sefseri, a Tunisian variant of haik made of a single piece of cloth that does not cover the face, has been virtually abandoned. However it is still sometimes traditionally worn, especially by older women.

Gallery

See also 
 Battoulah
 Veil#Islam
 M’laya

References 

Arab culture
Arabic clothing
Tunisian culture
Algerian culture
Libyan culture
Moroccan culture
Islamic female clothing